Electric Loco Shed, Tughlakabad is a motive power depot performing locomotive maintenance and repair facility for electric locomotives of the Indian Railways, located at  of the Northern Railway in Delhi, India. It is one of the three electric locomotive sheds of the West Central Railway, the others being at Itarsi and New Katni Jn  As of 1 March 2022 there are 262 locomotives in the shed.

Locomotives

References

External links 

 Website
 Particulars
 maps of Indian Railway Loco Sheds
 showing the Tughlakabad Electric Loco Shed

Tuglakabad
Rail transport in Delhi
Buildings and structures in Delhi
1977 establishments in Delhi